Union County is the northeasternmost county in the U.S. state of New Mexico. As of the 2010 census, the population was 4,549, making it the fourth-least populous county in New Mexico. Its county seat is Clayton. The county was formed in 1894. Union County borders Colorado to the north, and Oklahoma and Texas to the east.

History
Union County, was created by an act of the territorial legislation in 1893 and was officially recognized on January 1, 1894, when the first slate of elected county officials received their oaths of office. The county is named “Union” because the citizens were united in their desire for the creation of a new county out of three existing New Mexico counties. Union County was subsequently “carved up” by the creation of additional counties, Quay in 1903 and Harding in 1920. At one time, Union County had a population of over 20,000. There were a number of bustling communities such as Amistad, Hayden, Sedan, Pasamonte, Gladstone, Mt Dora, Grenville, Des Moines, Folsom, and Dedman (now known as Capulin).

Geography

Adjacent counties

 Las Animas County, Colorado (north)
 Baca County, Colorado (northeast)
 Cimarron County, Oklahoma (east/Central Time border)
 Dallam County, Texas (east/Central Time border)
 Hartley County, Texas (southeast/Central Time border)
 Quay County (south)
 Harding County (south)
 Colfax County (west)

Union County is one of the few counties in the U.S. to border counties from four different states. One of its neighbors is Cimarron County, Oklahoma, the only US county to border counties from five different states.

National protected areas
 Capulin Volcano National Monument
 Kiowa National Grassland (part)

Demographics

2000 census
As of the 2000 census, there were 4,174 people, 1,733 households, and 1,176 families living in the county. The racial makeup of the county was 80.38% White, 0.96% Native American, 0.34% Asian, 0.12% Pacific Islander, 16.00% from other races, and 2.20% from two or more races. 35.10% of the population were Hispanic or Latino of any race.

There were 1,733 households, out of which 31.10% had children under the age of 18 living with them, 54.70% were married couples living together, 9.10% had a female householder with no husband present, and 32.10% were non-families. 30.00% of all households were made up of individuals, and 14.90% had someone living alone who was 65 years of age or older. The average household size was 2.40 and the average family size was 2.99.

In the county, the population was spread out, with 27.30% under the age of 18, 6.30% from 18 to 24, 24.60% from 25 to 44, 24.10% from 45 to 64, and 17.80% who were 65 years of age or older. The median age was 40 years. For every 100 females there were 97.00 males. For every 100 females age 18 and over, there were 96.30 males.

The median income for a household in the county was $28,080, and the median income for a family was $35,313. Males had a median income of $26,364 versus $18,711 for females. The per capita income for Union county was $14,700. About 14.20% of families and 18.10% of the population were below the poverty line, including 31.40% of those under age 18 and 8.30% of those age 65 or over.

2010 census
As of the 2010 census, there were 4,549 people, 1,695 households, and 1,073 families living in the county. The racial makeup of the county was 81.7% white, 2.0% American Indian, 1.8% black or African American, 0.5% Asian, 11.7% from other races, and 2.3% from two or more races. Those of Hispanic or Latino origin made up 39.7% of the population. In terms of ancestry, 13.6% were German, 10.3% were Irish, 7.4% were English, and 7.0% were American.

Of the 1,695 households, 28.8% had children under the age of 18 living with them, 48.8% were married couples living together, 10.1% had a female householder with no husband present, 36.7% were non-families, and 33.2% of all households were made up of individuals. The average household size was 2.29 and the average family size was 2.90. The median age was 40.9 years.

The median income for a household in the county was $39,975 and the median income for a family was $41,687. Males had a median income of $29,388 versus $23,333 for females. The per capita income for the county was $19,228. About 6.9% of families and 9.8% of the population were below the poverty line, including 10.5% of those under age 18 and 9.3% of those age 65 or over.

Communities

Town
 Clayton (county seat)

Villages
 Des Moines
 Folsom
 Grenville

Census-designated place
 Capulin

Other communities

 Amistad
 Gladstone
 Hayden
 Mount Dora
 Sedan
 Seneca
 Sofia
 Stead

Politics
Like all of Eastern New Mexico, Union County is heavily Republican. The county has not voted for a Democratic presidential candidate since 1948. Hillary Clinton in 2016 received the worst showing for a Democrat in the county's history – but this was partially due to a large migration towards third-party candidates such as New Mexico native and former governor Gary Johnson, who ran as a libertarian. In 2020, Donald Trump went on to receive the best performance for a Republican in the county's history.

See also
 Folsom Falls
 National Register of Historic Places listings in Union County, New Mexico

References

External links

 County website

 
1894 establishments in New Mexico Territory
Populated places established in 1894